Andy Pope (born March 3, 1984) is an American professional golfer.

Pope was born in Glen Ellyn, Illinois. He played college golf at Xavier University and graduated in 2006. Individually, in 2003 he was Atlantic 10 Conference runner-up and in 2004 he was conference champion - in 2003 and 2005 he was part of a team championship.

Pope has played on the Web.com Tour since 2012 with a best finish of T-6 at the 2012 Mexico Open.

Pope finished tied for 70th at the 2015 U.S. Open. He qualified for the tournament by earning medalist honors at sectional qualifying in Jupiter, Florida along with Luke Donald and Jack Maguire.

Professional wins
2022 Florida Open

Results in major championships
Results not in chronological order in 2020.

CUT = missed the half-way cut
"T" indicates a tie for a place
NT = No tournament due to COVID-19 pandemic

References

External links

American male golfers
PGA Tour golfers
Golfers from Illinois
Xavier Musketeers men's golfers
People from Glen Ellyn, Illinois
1984 births
Living people